The 2020–21 UEFA Women's Champions League was the 20th edition of the European women's club football championship organised by UEFA, and the 12th edition since being rebranded as the UEFA Women's Champions League.

The final was held at the Gamla Ullevi in Gothenburg, Sweden. The winners of the 2020–21 UEFA Women's Champions League automatically qualified for the 2021–22 UEFA Women's Champions League group stage, which will be the first edition to feature a 16-team group stage.

Lyon were the defending champions, having won the previous five editions, but were eliminated by Paris Saint-Germain in the quarter-finals. Barcelona won their first title by beating Chelsea in the final, becoming the first club to have won both men's and women's Champions League titles.

Due to the COVID-19 pandemic in Europe, each local health department allowed a different number of spectators.

Association team allocation
The association ranking based on the UEFA women's country coefficients was used to determine the number of participating teams for each association:
Associations 1–12 each had two teams qualify.
All other associations , if they have entered, each had one team qualify.
The winners of the 2019–20 UEFA Women's Champions League were given an additional entry if they did not qualify for the 2020–21 UEFA Women's Champions League through their domestic league. However, the title holders had qualified through their domestic league, meaning the additional entry was not necessary for this season.

An association must have had an eleven-a-side women's domestic league to enter a team. In 2019–20, 52 of the 55 UEFA member associations organized a women's domestic league, with the exceptions being Andorra, Liechtenstein and San Marino.

Association ranking
For the 2020–21 UEFA Women's Champions League, the associations were allocated places according to their 2019 UEFA women's country coefficients, which took into account their performance in European competitions from 2014–15 to 2018–19. For the first time there were two entries for the Netherlands and Kazakhstan.

Notes

NR – No rank (association did not enter in any of the seasons used for computing coefficients)
DNE – Did not enter
NL – No women's domestic league

Distribution
Unlike the men's Champions League, not every association entered a team, and so the exact number of teams entering in the qualifying rounds (played as two rounds of single-legged ties for this season) and knockout phase (starting from the round of 32, played as home-and-away two-legged ties except for the one-match final) could not be determined until the full entry list was known. In general, the title holders, the champions of the top 12 associations, and the runners-up of highest-ranked associations (exact number depending on the number of entries) received a bye to the round of 32. All other teams (runners-up of lowest-ranked associations and champions of associations starting from 13th) entered the qualifying round, with the group winners and a maximum of two best runners-up advancing to the round of 32.

The following was the access list for this season.

Teams
In early April 2020, UEFA announced that due to the COVID-19 pandemic in Europe, the deadline for entering the tournament had been postponed until further notice. On 17 June 2020, UEFA announced that associations had to enter their teams by 10 August 2020. The 2020–21 season was the first where teams had to obtain a UEFA club license to participate in the UEFA Women's Champions League.

A total of 62 teams from 50 of the 55 UEFA member associations participated in the 2020–21 UEFA Women's Champions League.

The labels in the parentheses show how each team qualified for the place of its starting round:
TH: Title holders
1st, 2nd: League positions of the previous season
Abd-: League positions of abandoned season due to the COVID-19 pandemic in Europe as determined by the national association; all teams were subject to approval by UEFA as per the guidelines for entry to European competitions in response to the COVID-19 pandemic

Notes

Schedule
The schedule of the competition was as follows (all draws were held at the UEFA headquarters in Nyon, Switzerland). The tournament would have originally started in August 2020, but was initially delayed to October due to the COVID-19 pandemic in Europe. However, due to the continuing pandemic in Europe, UEFA announced a new format and schedule on 16 September 2020. Instead of mini-tournaments, the qualifying rounds were played as two rounds of single leg knockout matches.

The original schedule of the competition, as planned before the pandemic, and the schedule announced in June 2020, under the original format, was as follows.

Effects of the COVID-19 pandemic
Due to the COVID-19 pandemic in Europe, the following special rules were applicable to the competition:
If there were travel restrictions related to the COVID-19 pandemic that prevented the away team from entering the home team's country or returning to their own country, the match could be played at a neutral country or the away team's country that allowed the match to take place.
If a team refused to play or was considered responsible for a match not taking place, they were considered to have forfeited the match. If both teams refused to play or were considered responsible for a match not taking place, both teams were disqualified.
If a team had players and/or officials tested positive for SARS-2 coronavirus preventing them from playing the match before the deadline set by UEFA, they were considered to have forfeited the match.

On 24 September 2020, UEFA announced that five substitutions would be permitted, with a sixth allowed in extra time. However, each team was only given three opportunities to make substitutions during matches, with a fourth opportunity in extra time, excluding substitutions made at half-time, before the start of extra time and at half-time in extra time. Consequently, a maximum of twelve players could be listed on the substitute bench.

Qualifying rounds

First qualifying round

Second qualifying round

Knockout phase

Bracket

Round of 32

Round of 16

Quarter-finals

Semi-finals

Final

Statistics

Top goalscorers

There were 318 goals scored in 89 matches, with an average of  goals per match.

Goals scored in qualifying rounds count toward the topscorer award.

Notes

Squad of the season
The following 23 players were named in the squad of the season by the UEFA's technical observers:

Players of the season

Votes were cast for players of the season by coaches of the sixteen teams who participated in the tournament's round of 16, together with twenty journalists selected by the European Sports Media (ESM) group who specialize in women's football. The coaches were not allowed to vote for players from their own teams. Jury members selected their top three players, with the first receiving five points, the second three and the third one. The shortlist of the top three players was announced on 13 August 2021. The award winners were announced and presented during the 2021–22 UEFA Champions League group stage draw in Turkey on 26 August 2021.

Goalkeeper of the season

Defender of the season

Midfielder of the season

Forward of the season

See also
2020–21 UEFA Champions League

Notes

References

External links

UEFA Women's Champions League Matches: 2020–21, UEFA.com
Women's Domestic Leagues, UEFA.com

 
2020-21
Women's Champions League
2020 in women's association football
2021 in women's association football
Association football events postponed due to the COVID-19 pandemic